Taika David Cohen  (born 16 August 1975), known professionally as Taika Waititi, is a New Zealand filmmaker, actor and comedian. He is a recipient of an Academy Award, a BAFTA Award, and a Grammy Award, and has received two nominations at the Primetime Emmy Awards. His feature films Boy (2010) and Hunt for the Wilderpeople (2016) have each been the top-grossing New Zealand film.

Time magazine named him one of the 100 most influential people in the world on its annual list in 2022.

Waititi's 2003 short film Two Cars, One Night earned him an Academy Award nomination for Best Live Action Short Film. He co-wrote, co-directed and starred in the horror comedy film What We Do in the Shadows (2014) with Jemaine Clement, which was adapted into a television series of the same name in 2019. The series has been nominated for the Primetime Emmy Award for Outstanding Comedy Series. His most recent directing credits include the superhero films Thor: Ragnarok (2017) and Thor: Love and Thunder (2022) as well as the black comedy film Jojo Rabbit (2019), the last of which he also wrote and starred in as an imaginary version of Adolf Hitler. Jojo Rabbit received six Academy Award nominations and won Best Adapted Screenplay. Waititi also earned a Grammy Award for producing the film's soundtrack.

In television, Waititi co-created and executive produces the dramedy series Reservation Dogs, and directs, executive produces, and stars in the comedy Our Flag Means Death. In addition to directing an episode of the series The Mandalorian, he also voiced the character IG-11, for which he was nominated for the Primetime Emmy Award for Outstanding Character Voice-Over Performance.

Early life
Taika David Cohen was born on 16 August 1975 in Raukokore in the Bay of Plenty region of New Zealand's North Island, and grew up on both the East Coast and in the Aro Valley of Wellington. His father was an artist of Te Whānau-ā-Apanui descent, whilst his mother, Robin Cohen, was a schoolteacher. Waititi stated that his mother's family were Russian Jews, while his father's side was "Māori and a little bit of French Canadian". Waititi describes himself as a "Polynesian Jew". He was raised more connected to his Māori roots, in a household where Judaism was not "actively practis[ed]". The politician Kiri Allan is his cousin.

Waititi's parents split up when he was around five, and he was raised primarily by his mother. He attended Onslow College, then studied theatre at Victoria University of Wellington where he graduated with a Bachelor of Arts in 1997. He originally used his mother's surname, Cohen, for his work in film and writing, and his father's, Waititi, for visual arts endeavours. Following the success of his first short film, he continued to use Waititi professionally.

Career

Early career
While a student at Victoria University of Wellington, Waititi was part of the five-member comedy ensemble So You're a Man, which toured New Zealand and Australia with some success. He was half of the comedy duo The Humourbeasts alongside Jemaine Clement, which received New Zealand's highest comedy accolade, the Billy T Award, in 1999. Among a variety of artistic interests, Waititi began making comical short films for New Zealand's annual 48-hour film contest. His short film Two Cars, One Night (2003) earned him an Academy Award nomination in 2005. At the awards ceremony, he famously feigned falling asleep as the nominations were being read. His first feature film, a romantic comedy called Eagle vs Shark, was released in U.S. theatres for limited distribution in 2007. Waititi co-wrote the film with Loren Horsley. That year, Waititi wrote and directed one episode of the TV show Flight of the Conchords and directed another.

In 2010, he acted in the New Zealand TV3 improv sketch comedy show Radiradirah, together with frequent collaborators Rhys Darby and Jemaine Clement.

His second feature, Boy, premiered at the Sundance Film Festival in January 2010, and was nominated for the Grand Jury Prize. Waititi also took one of the main roles, as the ex-con father who returns to his family. On its release in New Zealand, Boy received enthusiastic reviews and was successful at the local box office, eclipsing several records. Following the film's success, Waititi hoped its signature track, "Poi E", would get to #1 (for the second time) on the New Zealand charts. It reached #3, but became #1 on iTunes. In 2011, Waititi directed New Zealand TV series Super City starring Madeleine Sami, who plays five characters living in one city. That year, Waititi portrayed Thomas Kalmaku in the superhero film Green Lantern.

2013–2019: Recognition

In 2013, Waititi co-wrote, co-directed and acted in the vampire comedy mockumentary What We Do in the Shadows with Clement. It premiered at the Sundance Film Festival in January 2014. Waititi and Clement played members of a group of vampires who live in an appropriately gothic house in modern-day Wellington. A television adaptation of the film was commissioned in May 2018, with Waititi as an executive producer and director. The series of the same name premiered on FX in March 2019; its second season received a Primetime Emmy Award nomination for Outstanding Comedy Series.

Waititi's fourth feature, Hunt for the Wilderpeople, premiered at the 2016 Sundance Film Festival. When it was released in New Zealand, the comedy adventure broke Waititi's record for a New Zealand film in its opening weekend. Based on a book by Barry Crump, it centres on a young boy (played by Julian Dennison) and a grumpy man (played by Sam Neill) on the run in the forest. Waititi wrote the initial screenplay for the 2016 Disney film Moana, which focused on gender and family. Those elements were passed over in favour of what became the final story.

In 2017, Waititi won the award for New Zealander of the Year, but was unable to receive it in person due to work commitments. That year, he directed his first major studio film, Marvel Studios's Thor: Ragnarok, which was released in October. He also portrayed the alien Korg via motion capture in the film. He had previously directed a short film series for Marvel called Team Thor, chronicling the lives of Thor and his roommate, Darryl Jacobson. Thor: Ragnarok earned critical praise and was successful at the box office. Waititi was later consulted by Christopher Markus and Stephen McFeely on Thor's storylines for Avengers: Infinity War, to maintain the character's consistency in the Marvel Cinematic Universe.

In 2019, Waititi wrote and directed Jojo Rabbit, based on the book Caging Skies by Christine Leunens, the 1940s-set story of a child in the Hitler Youth whose mother is secretly hiding a Jewish girl in their home. Waititi plays a buffoonish version of Adolf Hitler as the boy's imaginary friend. Waititi received Academy Award nominations for Best Picture and Best Adapted Screenplay. He won the latter, making him the first person of Māori descent to win an Academy Award in a screenplay category, and the first indigenous person to be nominated for and win Best Adapted Screenplay. In 2021 he won the Grammy Award for Best Compilation Soundtrack for Visual Media as a producer of the Jojo Rabbit soundtrack.

In October 2018, Lucasfilm announced that Waititi would be one of the directors of the Star Wars live-action streaming series The Mandalorian, which tells the story of a lone Mandalorian gunfighter in the period between the events of Return of the Jedi and The Force Awakens. The series premiered on 12 November 2019; Waititi also voices a droid bounty hunter named IG-11 in the series. He directed the series' first-season finale, "Chapter 8: Redemption". His voiceover work earned him a Primetime Emmy Award nomination for Outstanding Character Voice-Over Performance in 2020.

2020–present: Recent career
In 2020, Waititi narrated a charity reading of James and the Giant Peach by Roald Dahl. He portrayed Ratcatcher in the DC superhero film The Suicide Squad, released in August 2021 to positive reviews. Also in August, Waititi portrayed Antwan Hovachelik, the antagonist of the action comedy film Free Guy. With Sterlin Harjo, Waititi co-created the comedy series Reservation Dogs, which chronicles the lives of a group of indigenous Oklahoma teens, and comprises a main cast, directors, producers, and writers of indigenous peoples. It premiered on FX and received positive reviews.

Waititi executive produced, directed and starred as Blackbeard in the HBO Max comedy series Our Flag Means Death. The first season was released in March 2022. That same year, Time magazine placed him on its annual list of the 100 most influential people in the world. Waititi performed as a voice actor in the 2022 animated film Lightyear as Mo Morrison. He wrote and directed the superhero film Thor: Love and Thunder, a sequel to Thor: Ragnarok. It released in July 2022.

Waititi also directed a feature film adaptation of the documentary Next Goal Wins prior to directing Thor: Love and Thunder. The film, which had been delayed, is set to be released in September 2023 after Armie Hammer's scenes were re-shot with Will Arnett taking over the role. He is set to direct a live-action film adaptation of Akira. He is slated to co-write a sequel to What We Do in the Shadows, titled We're Wolves, and direct and co-write a live-action Star Wars film, which is expected to be released before Rogue Squadron. Waititi is attached to write, direct and executive produce two animated series for Netflix based on Roald Dahl's children's novel Charlie and the Chocolate Factory and its sequel, one adapting the novels and the other focused on the novel's Oompa Loompa characters. He is set to executive produce and direct the Showtime limited series The Auteur. He is slated to write and direct a film based on Flash Gordon for 20th Century Studios. In November 2021, it was announced that Waititi would adapt The Incal into a feature film.

Personal life
Waititi was in a relationship with New Zealand actress and writer Loren Horsley for ten years: she co-wrote and acted in his directorial debut, Eagle vs Shark. Waititi married New Zealand film producer Chelsea Winstanley in 2011. They have two daughters. He and Winstanley separated in 2018. Waititi has been in a relationship with British singer Rita Ora since 2021. The two married in the summer of 2022, but declined to confirm it publicly until January 2023.

Waititi incorporates his Māori and Indigenous heritage into his projects, such as by including indigenous interns and having traditional owners conduct a Welcome to Country ceremony during the start of filming on set in Australia. He is an executive producer of the New Zealand films The Breaker Upperers (2018), Baby Done (2020), and Night Raiders (2021), all directed by Māori or Indigenous filmmakers. Waititi's cousin Tweedie Waititi, whom he considers a sibling, began producing and directing Māori language versions of Disney animated films due to Waititi, which she does alongside his former partner Winstanley.

Filmography

Short films

Feature film 

Acting roles

Television

Acting roles
{| class = "wikitable"
|-
! Year
! Title
! Role
! Notes
|-
|rowspan=2| 2002
| The Strip
| Mostin
| 13 Episodes
|-
| The Tribe
| Virtual RealityCowboy No.1 
| Episode: "Episode #4.24" (uncredited)
|-
|rowspan=2| 2003
| Revelations
| Ali
| Episode: "Mended Sole"
|-
| Freaky
| Cleaner
| Episode: "Fridge, Cleaner & Sister"
|-
| 2007
| Flight of the Conchords
| Gipsy Kings fan
| Episode: "Drive By" (uncredited cameo)
|-
| 2009
| The Jaquie Brown Diaries
| Friendly Gypsy
| Episode: "Brownward Spiral"
|-
| 2010
| Radiradirah
| Various
| 8 episodes
|-
| rowspan="4"|2019
| What We Do in the Shadows
| Viago
| Episode: "The Trial"
|-
| The Mandalorian
| IG-11
| Voice; 4 episodesNominated – Primetime Emmy Award for Outstanding Voice-Over Performance
|-
| Year of the Rabbit
| Merrick's Performer
| Cameo
|-
| Rick and Morty
| Glootie
| VoiceEpisode: "The Old Man and the Seat"
|-
| 2020
| Home Movie: The Princess Bride
| Westley/The Man in Black
|-
|rowspan=2| 2021
|RuPaul's Drag Race Down Under
|Guest star
|1 episode
|-
| What If...?| Korg
| VoiceEpisode: "What If... Thor Were an Only Child?"
|-
| 2022
| Our Flag Means Death| Blackbeard
| Main role
|}

Uncredited works

Music videos

 "Ladies of the World", Flight of the Conchords (2007)
 "Mutha'uckas", Flight of the Conchords (2007)
 "Leggy Blonde", Flight of the Conchords (2007)
 "Shanks’ Pony", Age Pryor (2007)
 "Bright Grey", The Phoenix Foundation (2007)
 "My Imminent Demise", Luke Buda (2008)
 "40 Years", The Phoenix Foundation (2009)
 "World Gone Sour (The Lost Kids)", Method Man (2011)
 “My Sweet Lord”, George Harrison (2021)

Commercials

Waititi has also been a prolific commercial director. He directed Air New Zealand's "The Most Epic Safety Video Ever Made" featuring Peter Jackson and Elijah Wood as they go through where The Lord of the Rings films were shot. The commercial went viral amassing over 19 million views on YouTube. Waititi directed Tesco's "Borg," which features a comical Thor-esque character shopping in the supermarket; he went on to direct Marvel Studios' Thor: Ragnarok years later.

 "Friends Reunited", Friends Reunited (2008)
 "Moussaka Rap", Pot Noodle (2008)
 "I Wish (That Girls Were More Like Pot Noodles)", Pot Noodle (2008)
 "Back with no Appetite", Pot Noodle (2008)
 "World Gone Sour (The Lost Kids)", Sour Patch Kids (2011)
 "Simply The Best", Cadbury Dairy Milk (2011)
 "Gold", Wispa (2011)
 "Superbowl Brotherhood of Man", NBC (2012)
 "Pure", Steinlager (2012)
 "New Girl", Old Navy (2012)
 "Why Choose?", Old Navy (2012)
 "Bee Bots!", Old Navy (2012)
 "Australia Day", Lambnesia (2013)
 "State Of The -Ation", Samsung (2013)
 "MIDWULS", Optimum Cable (2013)
 "Borg" Tesco (2013)
 "Pierce Brosnan", Sky Ireland (2013)
 "Blazed", New Zealand Transport Agency (2013)
 "#HELLOBEER", Carlton (2013)
 "The Kids Party", Nimble (2014)
 "The Gas Bill", Nimble (2014)
 "The Phone Bill", Nimble (2014)
 "Laura", Stop Before You Start (2014)
 "Toa", Stop Before You Start (2014)
 "Tori", Stop Before You Start (2014)
 "Jackson", Stop Before You Start (2014)
 "Destiny", Stop Before You Start (2014)
 "The Most Epic Safety Video Ever", Air New Zealand (2014)
 "Watch It Over and Over", Nova Energy (2014)
 "Tinnyvision", New Zealand Transport Agency (2014)
 "Choose Your Trebor - Confessions", Trebor Mints (2015)
 "Broadband Made Simple", 2degrees (2015)
 "Gorgeous Greta", Crazy Domains (2015)
 "Kev of All Trades", Crazy Domains (2015)
 "Stuff Your Loved Ones", Crazy Domains (2015)
 "Taika's Appeal", New Zealand Human Rights Commission (2017)
 "Locker room", DirecTV (2018)
 "Talk to the Land", Old Spice (2018)
 "Stay Cool", Old Spice (2018)
 "Voice of Racism", New Zealand Human Rights Commission (2020)
 "Coca-Cola Christmas Commercial", Coca-Cola (2020)
 "Xbox Series X – Lucid Odyssey", Xbox (2020)
 "Belvedere Presents Daniel Craig", Belvedere Vodka (2022)

Frequent collaborators

Accolades

Waititi has received various awards and nominations, including an Academy Award, a British Academy Film Award, a Grammy Award, a Writers Guild of America Award, and nominations for the Golden Globe Awards and Primetime Emmy Awards among others.

In 2005, Waititi received a nomination for the Academy Award for Best Live Action Short Film for the short film Two Cars, One Night (2004). In 2019, he wrote and directed the comedy-drama film Jojo Rabbit, which was met with critical acclaim and earned him the Academy Award for Best Adapted Screenplay, the BAFTA Award for Best Adapted Screenplay, and nominations for the Academy Award for Best Picture, the Golden Globe Award for Best Musical or Comedy Film and the Directors Guild of America Award for Outstanding Directing in a Feature Film. For the soundtrack of the film, he won the Grammy Award for Best Compilation Soundtrack for Visual Media.

Since 2019, he has written and produced the television series What We Do in the Shadows'', based on the 2014 film of the same name, for which he was nominated for the Primetime Emmy Award for Outstanding Comedy Series and the Writers Guild of America Award for Best New Series.

In the 2020 Queen's Birthday Honours, Waititi was appointed an Officer of the New Zealand Order of Merit, for services to film.

See also
 Time 100

References

External links

 

1975 births
21st-century New Zealand writers
21st-century New Zealand male actors
21st-century screenwriters
Action film directors
Audiobook narrators
Best Adapted Screenplay Academy Award winners
Best Adapted Screenplay BAFTA Award winners
Best Screenplay AACTA International Award winners
Comedy film directors
English-language film directors
Fantasy film directors
Grammy Award winners
Horror film directors
Independent Spirit Award winners
Indigenous filmmakers in New Zealand
Jewish film people
Jewish writers
Living people
Male motion capture actors
Māori-language film directors
New Zealand comedians
New Zealand film directors
New Zealand Jews
New Zealand male comedians
New Zealand male Māori actors
New Zealand male voice actors
New Zealand screenwriters
Male screenwriters
Officers of the New Zealand Order of Merit
People educated at Onslow College
People from the Bay of Plenty Region
Science fiction film directors
Victoria University of Wellington alumni
Te Whānau-ā-Apanui people
Taika
Writers Guild of America Award winners